The Secret of Bacchus is a 1984 Romanian comedy film directed by Geo Saizescu.

Cast 
 Emil Hossu - Mirea
 Ștefan Mihăilescu-Brăila - Bachus
 Dem Rădulescu - Sterea
 Gheorghe Dinică - Cercel
 Sebastian Papaiani - Grig Stevie
 Jean Constantin - Bulbuc
  - Pica Barbu
 Octavian Cotescu - Vladimir Cocea

References

External links 

1984 comedy films
1984 films
Romanian comedy films
1980s Romanian-language films